Peter Alexander Beckett (30 June 1982 – 10 April 2018) was a British actor. He was best known for his role in the BBC TV comedy series Twenty Twelve and its follow-up W1A. He played many theatre roles, including Higgins in Pygmalion in 2017, and several characters, including Fidel Castro, in the 2013 musical hybrid production of the Neon Neon album Praxis Makes Perfect. He also played Michael in the BBC Radio 4 drama Tracks.

Death
Beckett died at his home in South Norwood, London, on 10 April 2018, aged 35, in what was ruled by the coroner to be suicide by hanging; it was noted that, at the time of his death, Beckett had been suffering from depression for almost a year.  Director Josie Rourke dedicated Mary Queen of Scots to Beckett's memory.
He played the role of Walter Mildmay, English Chancellor of the Exchequer.

Filmography

Film

Television

Radio

References

External links
 

1982 births
2018 deaths
2018 suicides
People from Carmarthenshire
Suicides by hanging in England
British male television actors
21st-century British male actors